Bossvika is a village in Risør municipality in Agder county, Norway. The village is located along the southern shore of the Søndeledfjorden.

References

Villages in Agder
Risør